{{Infraspeciesbox
|name = Pink mountain-correa
|image = Correa lawrenceana cordifolia.jpg
|image_caption = Cultivated specimen in the A.C.T.
|genus = Correa
|species = lawrenceana
|varietas = cordifolia
|authority = Paul G.Wilson<ref name="APC">{{cite web |title=Correa lawrenceana var. cordifolia|url=https://biodiversity.org.au/nsl/services/apc-format/display/80600|publisher=Australian Plant Census |accessdate= 12 July 2020}}</ref>
|synonyms_ref =  
|synonyms = * Correa lawrenciana var. cordifolia Paul G.Wilson orth.var.
}}Correa lawrenceana var. cordifolia, commonly known as the pink mountain-correa, is a variety of Correa lawrenceana and is endemic to south-eastern Australia. It is a shrub with leathery, broadly egg-shaped to heart-shaped leaves, and pink flowers with yellowish tips arranged singly or in groups of two or three in leaf axils.

Flowering mostly occurs in spring.

Taxonomy
The variety cordifolia was first formally described in 1961 by Paul Wilson in Transactions of the Royal Society of South Australia from specimens collected by Ernest Francis Constable on Mount Dromedary in 1953.

Distribution and habitat
This variety of C. lawrenceana grows in forest, including rainforest, on the coast and nearby tablelands of New South Wales and the Australian Capital Territory and south from Lake Conjola and Braidwood, to the far north-eastern corner of Victoria.

Conservation status
This variety is listed as  "vulnerable" on the Department of Sustainability and Environment's Advisory List of Rare Or Threatened Plants In Victoria''.

References

lawrenciana cordifolia
Flora of Victoria (Australia)
Flora of New South Wales
Flora of the Australian Capital Territory
Taxa named by Paul G. Wilson
Plants described in 1961